Start Over is an album released by R&B artist Cheryl Lynn in 1987. This album also marks Lynn's recording debut on Manhattan Records, though it would be her only album for this label. The album charted higher than her previous release, but still stalled at #55 on the US R&B chart. Two singles, "New Dress" and "If You Were Mine" were released, and, while the latter single just missed the R&B top ten, neither of them could revive the project. Cheryl Lynn would sign with Virgin Records for her next release. This album is currently out of print.

Track listing
 "New Dress" (Bernadette Cooper, Roman Johnson) - 5:15
 "Don't Bury Me" (Lynn, Thurlene Johnson) - 5:12
 "Don't Run Away" (Lynn, David Paich) - 5:17
 "Start Over" (Lynn, Thurlene Johnson) - 4:46
 "No Curfew" (Todd Cochran, Thurlene Johnson) - 4:43
 "If You Were Mine" (Carl Sturken, Evan Rogers, Robin Smith) - 5:05
 "Just Another Pretty Face" (Amp Fiddler, Bernadette Cooper) - 4:51
 "Everyday" (Lynn, George Smith III) - 4:29
 "Married Man" (Bernadette Cooper, James Strong, Roman Johnson) - 4:29

References

 http://www.allmusic.com/album/start-over-r74438

1987 albums
Cheryl Lynn albums
Manhattan Records albums